The Presidium of the 19th Congress of the Communist Party of the Soviet Union (CPSU) was in session from 1952 to 1956.

Composition

Members

Candidates

Organs of the 19th Presidium (dissolved in March 1953)

Bureau of the Presidium
 Lavrentiy Beria (1889–1953)
 Nikolai Bulganin (1895–1975)
 Kliment Voroshilov (1881–1969)
 Lazar Kaganovich (1893–1991)
 Georgy Malenkov (1902–1988)
 Mikhail Pervukhin (1904–1978)
 Maksim Saburov (1900–1977)
 Joseph Stalin (1878–1953)
 Nikita Khrushchev (1894–1971)

Standing Committee on Ideological Questions
 Aleksey Rumyantsev (1905–1993) — Chairman from 18 November 1952 until 23 March 1953.
 Mikhail Suslov (1902–1982)
 Dmitry Chesnokov (1910–1973)
 Dmitry Shepilov (1905–1995) — Chairman from 10 October 1952 until 18 November 1952.
 Pavel Yudin (1899–1968)

Standing Committee on Defense
 Lavrentiy Beria (1899–1953)
 Nikolai Bulganin (1895–1975) — Chairman from 10 October 1952 until 3 March 1953.
 Aleksandr Vasilevsky (1895–1977)
 Kliment Voroshilov (1883–1969)
 Semyon Zakharov (1906–1986)
 Lazar Kaganovich (1893–1991)
 Nikolay Kuznetsov (1904–1974)
 Vyacheslav Malyshev (1902–1957)
 Mikhail Pervukhin (1904–1978)
 Maksim Saburov (1900–1977)
 Leonid Brezhnev (1906–1982) — was appointed to the body on 19 November 1952.
 Gregory Gromov (1900–1977) — served as the body's Secretary from 10 October 1952 until 3 March 1953.

Standing Committee on Foreign Affairs
 Leonid Brezhnev (1906–1982)
 Andrei Vyshinsky (1883–1954)
 Semyon Ignatiev (1904–1983)
 Lazar Kaganovich (1893–1991)
 Vasily Kuznetsov (1901–1990)
 Pavel Kumykin (1901–1976)
 Otto Wille Kuusinen (1881–1964)
 Georgy Malenkov (1902–1982) — served as the body's Chairman from 10 October 1952 until 3 March 1953.
 Nikolai Mikhailov (1906–1982)
 Vyacheslav Molotov (1890–1986)
 Mikhail Pervukhin (1904–1978)
 Boris Ponomarev (1905–1995)
 Alexander Poskrebyshev (1891–1965)
 Mikhail Suslov (1902–1982)
 Lavrentiy Beria (1899–1953) — elected to the body on 11 December 1952.

References

External links
 Handbook of the History of the Communist Party of the Soviet Union 1898–1991

Politburo of the Central Committee of the Communist Party of the Soviet Union members
Politburo
Politburo
Politburo
Politburo
Politburo
Politburo
Politburo
Politburo